Franz Maria Doppelbauer (1845–1908) was the Catholic bishop of Linz from 1889 to 1908.

Doppelbauer established a newspaper and found a seminary, the Petrinum, in Urfahr.

Doppelbauer also founded a boy's seminary, the Petrinum, in Urfahr for training future clergy. Moreover, he was responsible for completion of the Linz cathedral in May 1905.

References

1845 births
1908 deaths
Bishops of Linz
19th-century Austrian Roman Catholic priests